The 1932 Auburn Tigers football team represented Auburn University in the 1932 Southern Conference football season.  Led by head coach Chet A. Wynne, the team went 9–0–1. The Tigers made an undefeated season and were named Southern Conference champions. The team featured Jimmy Hitchcock and Gump Ariail.

Schedule

Season summary

Birmingham–Southern
The season opened with a 61–0 defeat of Birmingham–Southern.

Erskine
In the second week of play, Erskine was beaten 77–0.

Duke
Auburn defeated coach Wallace Wade's Duke Blue Devils 18–7. On Jimmy Hitchcock's play, Wade said ""I have never seen a finer all-around back play against one of my teams."

Georgia Tech
Georgia Tech was beaten 6–0.

Tulane
Auburn beat the defending SoCon champion Tulane team 19–7. Hitchcock returned an interception 60 yards for a touchdown, and soon after had a 63-yard touchdown run out of a punting formation.

Ole Miss
Ole Miss was beaten by Auburn 14–7.

Howard
Howard was beaten 25–0 .

Florida
Auburn beat Florida 21–6. Hitchcock was taken out of a game for the first time in his career.

Georgia
In Columbus, Georgia was defeated  14–7 .

South Carolina
The season closed with a 20–20 tie against coach Billy Laval's South Carolina Gamecocks.

Postseason
Jimmy Hitchcock was All-American.

References

External links
 South Carolina–Auburn game video

Auburn
Auburn Tigers football seasons
Southern Conference football champion seasons
College football undefeated seasons
Auburn Tigers football